The Williwakas Glacier is a glacier located on the south flank of Mount Rainier in Washington. The glacier lies below the Paradise Glacier. Due to its relatively low elevation—–—the glacier is small and surrounded by small snow fields above the regional tree line. A stubby  peak is located to the east of the glacier.

See also
List of glaciers

References

Glaciers of Mount Rainier
Glaciers of Washington (state)